Dylon Frylinck (born 15 January 1992) is a South African rugby union player, who most recently played for . He is a utility back, that mainly plays at scrum-half.

Career

Youth

Born in Cape Town, South Africa, Frylinck started out his rugby career at Sweet Valley Primary School in Bergvliet and moved on to play for Wynberg Boys' High. In 2013, he was part of the Emerging Western Province squad. Frylinck was named in the  squad, but failed to make an appearance.

Western Province / Stormers

Pumas

He made seven appearances for the side, but was released at the end of the 2014 season.

Eastern Province Kings

In January 2015, Frylinck had a trial spell with Port Elizabeth-based side the  prior to the 2015 season. Following the trial, he was offered a contract for the duration of the 2015 Vodacom Cup competition.

Griquas

Following an injury to ' replacement scrum-half Rudi van Rooyen during the 2015 Currie Cup Premier Division, Frylinck was drafted into side as a replacement, signing a contract with the Kimberley-based side for the duration of the competition.

References

South African rugby union players
Living people
1992 births
Rugby union players from Cape Town
Rugby union scrum-halves
Stormers players
Western Province (rugby union) players
Alumni of Wynberg Boys' High School